Daniel Orrin Graham (April 13, 1925 – December 31, 1995) was a United States Army officer who ultimately rose to the rank of lieutenant general. Graham served in Germany, Korea, and Vietnam and received several decorations including some of the highest the United States military bestows: the Distinguished Service Medal, the Legion of Merit with two oak leaf clusters, and the Distinguished Intelligence Medal during his distinguished 30-year military career.

Early life and education
Graham was born in Portland, Oregon and grew up in Medford. He attended college at the United States Military Academy at West Point and earned a B.S. degree in 1946. He also graduated from the Army Command and General Staff College in 1959 and the Army War College in 1967.

History
From 1963 to 1966, Graham worked for the CIA in the Office of National Estimates. During the Vietnam war from 1967 to 1968 he was chief of the army's military intelligence estimates.
 
Graham served again in the Office of National Estimates during 1968–1971, then served as director of collections for the Defense Intelligence Agency in 1971. During 1973–1974 Graham served as deputy director of the CIA under Director William Colby and from 1974 to 1976 he was the director of the DIA. Ronald Reagan called upon General Graham to be his military advisor for his 1976 and 1980 campaigns. General Graham is a member of the Military Intelligence Hall of Fame.

In later years, Graham devoted a lot of time to the research and development of Single-Stage To Orbit (SSTO) spacecraft in conjunction with NASA. McDonnell Douglas was awarded a contract to build an SSTO test vehicle on August 16, 1991, and named it the DC-X for Delta Clipper Experimental. The name honored the firm's successful Thor/Delta rocket and recalled the famous 19th-century commercial clipper ships. The McDonnell Douglas SSTO team saw the Delta Clipper as opening the "space trade routes in the same way that the Yankee Clipper ships opened the sea trade routes." The needs of the commercial launch industry thus were integral to the thinking of the McDonnell Douglas DC-X team. General Graham envisioned the DC-X as the perfect inexpensive launch and delivery vehicle for his proposed Brilliant Pebbles space-based ballistic missile defense shield.

The first test launch of the DC-X was on August 18, 1993. The test flight verified flight control systems and vertical landing capabilities and was deemed a success after reaching a 46 m altitude in a 59-second flight. The second flight on September 11, 1993, tested ascent and landing mode control and ground effects survey, reaching 92 m in a 66-second flight. The third test flight on September 30, 1993, demonstrated 180 degree roll and provided aerostability data while reaching 370 m during 57 second flight. Unfortunately, this marked the last test of first series as the vehicle was mothballed when SDIO funding ran out.

On June 20, 1994, the DC-X rose once again for the first flight of second series after additional SDIO funding was received. Operating with a full propellent load, the flight tested the radar altimeter in control loop and reached an altitude of 870 m during a 136-second flight. Demonstrating an unplanned event on June 27, 1994, the DC-X became the first unmanned vehicle to save itself when an in-flight abort occurred after a gaseous hydrogen explosion. The vehicle demonstrated its autoland capabilities after reaching an altitude of 790 meters during a 78-second flight. After repairs were made, the DC-X continued expansion of the flight envelope on May 16, 1995, demonstrating constant angle of attack after reaching an altitude of 1330 m during a 124-second flight. Graham was elated and continued to work closely with the program. Graham would not live to see the full glory of the DC-X program. He died in December 1995.

On Friday, June 7, 1996, at White Sands, New Mexico, the second series vehicle designated DC-XA was successfully launched. After that flight, NASA officials announced that the DC-XA had been renamed the "Clipper Graham." That flight was the highest and longest the vehicle had ever flown until then.

Robert A. Heinlein dedicated his 1985 novel The Cat Who Walks Through Walls to 
Graham and eight of the other members of the Citizens' Advisory Council on National Space Policy.

Political activism
Graham was chairman of the American Space Frontier Committee and the Coalition for the Strategic Defense Initiative, and in 1978 became co-chairman of the Coalition for Peace through Strength.

After he retired from the army, Graham's goal was to promote a defense against nuclear weapons. The father of seven, said he felt it was unconscionable to fail to protect the American public against nuclear attack. Also, as a student of military history, he was keenly aware that no weapon was abandoned until a defense made the weapon obsolete.
 
In 1981, Graham founded High Frontier, Inc., a private organization that promotes a kinetic-energy weapons approach to space-based defense with help from members of President Ronald Reagan's "Kitchen Cabinet".
Graham served as the Project Director for the think tank and released its strategic plan in a book entitled "We Must Defend America and Put an End to MADness" in 1983. According to Graham, he is considered by most to be the actual originator of the Strategic Defense Initiative concept. The plan as put forward by Reagan also included an emphasis on directed energy technologies such as lasers and particle beams, in addition to the cheaper, "off the shelf" kinetic energy technologies promoted by Graham and High Frontier.

The Strategic Defense Initiative Organization was renamed by President Bill Clinton to the Ballistic Missile Defense Organization on May 13, 1993, and continues today. 

He was also a member of the American Freedom Coalition and was vice chairman of the U.S. Council for World Freedom, and served on the advisory board of a Unification Church sponsored anticommunist association, CAUSA- USA.

General Graham was also an unsuccessful Republican candidate for the Arlington County, Virginia, Board of Supervisors after his retirement from the military

Quote From Ronald Reagan

"As you know, Dan, you and I were talking about missile defense before you set up High Frontier in September of '81...You and a small group of dedicated, determined people helped us move the SDI concept over all the roadblocks put up by people of less vision and belief in American capacity. God bless you!"—President Ronald Reagan, March 1993

Awards and decorations

Death
He died of cancer at his home in Arlington, Virginia on Sunday, December 31, 1995, at the age of 70 and was buried at Arlington National Cemetery with full military honors.

Footnotes

References
Confessions of a Cold Warrior - his autobiography, 1995
Remembering General Dan Graham, by Paul Weyrich, cited by Hon. Frank R. Wolf in the House of Representatives, January 5, 1996

1925 births
1995 deaths
Military personnel from Portland, Oregon
United States Military Academy alumni
United States Army Command and General Staff College alumni
United States Army War College alumni
Recipients of the Legion of Merit
United States Army generals
Recipients of the Distinguished Service Medal (US Army)
Directors of the Defense Intelligence Agency
Recipients of the Distinguished Intelligence Medal
People from Arlington County, Virginia
Burials at Arlington National Cemetery